The Economic Group was a political party in Estonia.

History
The party first contested national elections in 1920, winning a single seat in the parliamentary elections with 1.1% of the vote. In the 1923 elections the party's vote share fell to 0.5% and it lost its only seat in the Riigikogu. It did not contest any further elections.

References

Defunct political parties in Estonia